State Road 456 (NM 456) is a  state highway in northeast New Mexico. NM 456's western terminus is in Folsom, New Mexico at NM 325, and the eastern terminus is at the Oklahoma state line west of Kenton, Oklahoma. At the state line, it becomes Oklahoma State Highway 325 (SH-325).

Route description
NM 456 parallels the Cimarron River for its entire length. It does not leave Union County. It is a former routing of U.S. Route 64 (US 64). Seventeen consecutive miles of it are unpaved, as per signs at each end of the unpaved stretch; their main purpose is to warn of potential impassibility in inclement weather. The drive has some nice scenic views, including one reminiscent of Colorado's Garden of the Gods; but its remoteness is not amicable to tourists having automobile breakdowns.

Major intersections

See also

References

External links

456
Transportation in Union County, New Mexico
U.S. Route 64